Narsingarh may refer to:
 Narsinghgarh, Damoh, a town in Damoh district of Madhya Pradesh, India
 Narsinghgarh State, a former princely state in British India
 Narsinghgarh, Rajgarh, a town in Rajgarh district, Madhya Pradesh, India
 Narsingarh, Tripura,  a town in West Tripura district, Tripura, India
 Narsingarh, Jharkhand, a small village and railway station in Jharkhand, India
 Narsinghgarh (Vidhan Sabha constituency), Rajgarh

See also
 Narsinghpur district,  a district of Madhya Pradesh state in central India
 Narsinghpur or Narsimhapur is a town in Madhya Pradesh state of central India